Amrita Devi Agrahari is a Nepalese politician representing People's Socialist Party, Nepal and current member of the House of Representatives. She was elected from the Indigenous peoples group in the party list from the Rastriya Janata Party Nepal.

Political career 
Agrahari was the general secretary of Nepal Sadbhawana Party. She was a member of the Madheshi Janaadhikar Forum, Nepal (Democratic) until its split in 2012. She joined the Rastriya Madhesh Samajbadi Party led by Sharat Singh Bhandari after the split.

She was a member of the Industry, Commerce, Labour and Consumer Welfare Committee of the House of Representatives.

References

Place of birth missing (living people)
Living people
Nepal Sadbhawana Party politicians
Nepal MPs 2017–2022
1960 births
People's Socialist Party, Nepal politicians
Madhesi Jana Adhikar Forum, Nepal politicians
Rastriya Janata Party Nepal politicians
Nepal MPs 2022–present